Operation Harrison was an operation conducted by the 1st Brigade, 101st Airborne Division in Phú Yên Province, lasting from 26 February to 25 March 1966.

Prelude
Brigadier General Pearson sought to use semi-guerilla tactics to locate Viet Cong and People's Army of Vietnam (PAVN) units and then bring firepower and mobility to bear on enemy units once located.

Operation

On 26 February the 2nd Battalion, 502nd Infantry Regiment was deployed by helicopter 30km northwest of Tuy Hòa, while the 2nd Battalion, 327th Infantry Regiment was landed by helicopter 10km southeast. The units were unable to locate any enemy forces.

On 4 March in the Tuy Hòa Valley, 16km southwest of Tuy Hòa City a villager approached the command post of the 1/327th which was providing rice harvest security to advise them that he had seen PAVN troops with mortars moving towards the village of Thanh Phu, 3km to the southwest. Two rifle companies were deployed towards Thanh Phu. As Company B passed the hamlet of My Phu they were hit by enemy fire. Company A proceeded to attack the hamlet across two dry rice paddies suffering heavy losses. Major David Hackworth arrived on the scene in the late afternoon and took command. The two companies made slow progress and by nightfall they disengaged. Maj Hackworth tried to establish a night cordon around the PAVN but lacked the manpower to do so, so instead positioned Tiger Force south of the hamlet and used artillery fire to cover the gaps in the cordon. The PAVN slipped away during the night, but the following morning 109 PAVN bodies were found around the hamlet. U.S. losses were 19 killed.

On 5 March 2/327th relieved 1/327th which moved further west. On 13 March 2/502nd made an unusual night assault to exploit a B-52 strike but found no enemy, a similar assault on 15 March was also fruitless. Prisoner interrogations revealed that the 95th Regiment had broken into small units and dispersed west into the mountains.

Aftermath
Operation Harrison officially concluded on 25 March, the US claiming PAVN losses were 288 killed and 35 captured, U.S. losses were 42 killed and 2 missing.

References

External links

Conflicts in 1966
1966 in Vietnam
Battles involving the United States
Battles involving Vietnam
Battles and operations of the Vietnam War in 1966
History of Phú Yên Province